Issaquah, Washington, is a suburb of Seattle in the U.S. state of Washington.

Issaquah may also refer to:

Places and businesses

Issaquah Alps, a nearby mountain range
Issaquah Creek, a minor stream
Issaquah Highlands, a residential neighborhood
Issaquah High School, a high school
Issaquah School District, the city's school district
Issaquah station, a historic railroad depot

Transportation
Issaquah 100 class ferry, a class of state ferries
Issaquah (steam ferry), a steam ferry built in 1914
, a state ferry built in 1979

See also